The Ford Falcon (XL) is a mid-size car which was produced by Ford Australia from 1962 to 1964. It was the second iteration of the first generation of the Falcon

Overview 
The Falcon XL was introduced in August 1962, replacing the Falcon XK which had been in production since 1960. Visual changes from the XK included a new convex grille, bumper mounted park/turn lights, new taillights, and a revised, squared off roofline (on the sedans) which was promoted as the “Thunderbird roofline”. Other changes included a new manual gearbox (although it was still a three-speed unit), new clutch, new starter motor, new air cleaner, new suspension system and a new carburettor.

Both of the engines from the XK were retained; a  Falcon Six inline-six, which produced  and an optional  version of the Falcon Six, which produced . Pricing started at £1,070 ($2,140 AUD) for a base model Falcon.

Model range 
The Falcon XL range included four-door sedan and five-door station wagons. The luxury Futura Sedan and Squire Wagon models were new for the XL series, the latter featuring simulated woodgrain side and rear panels. Commercial vehicle derivatives were available in two-door coupe utility and two-door panel van body styles with the latter marketed as the Falcon Sedan Delivery.

Models were marketed as follows:
 Falcon Sedan
 Falcon Deluxe Sedan
 Falcon Futura Sedan
 Falcon Station Wagon
 Falcon Deluxe Wagon
 Falcon Squire Wagon
 Falcon Utility
 Falcon Deluxe Utility
 Falcon Sedan Delivery

Production 
The Falcon XL was replaced by the Ford Falcon (XM) in February 1964, production having totalled 75,765 units.

Motorsport 

A Falcon XL driven by Bob Jane and Harry Firth was “first across the line” in the 1962 Armstrong 500, with the first four places in Class B filled by Falcon XLs.

References 

XL
Cars of Australia
Cars introduced in 1962
Cars discontinued in 1964
XL Falcon
Sedans
Station wagons
Vans
Rear-wheel-drive vehicles
1960s cars